Moktar Hossain is a Bangladeshi politician affiliated with the Jatiya Party who served the Khulna-4 district as a member of the Jatiya Sangsad from 1988 to 1991.

Birth and early life 
Moktar Hossain was born in Khulna District.

Career 
Moktar Hossain was elected to parliament from Khulna-4 as a Jatiya Party candidate in 1988. He is the general secretary of Khulna District Jatiya Party.

References

External links 
 List of 4th Parliament Members -Jatiya Sangsad (In Bangla)

Year of birth missing (living people)
Living people
People from Khulna District
Jatiya Party politicians
4th Jatiya Sangsad members